Estonia has participated at the Universiade since 1993. Estonia made the first appearance at the Winter Universiade in 1997.

Medal count

Medals by Summer Universiade
Estonia won 25 medals in appearances at the Summer Universiade and is at the 51st rank in the all-time Summer Universiade medal table.

Medals by Winter Universiade
Estonia has won 4 medal in appearances at the Winter Universiade and is at the 34th rank in the all-time Winter Universiade medal table.

List of medalists

Summer Universiade

Winter Universiade

See also
Estonia at the Olympics

References

External links
 Eesti Akadeemiline Spordiliit 

 
Nations at the Universiade